The men's 200 metres event at the 2003 Asian Athletics Championships was held in Manila, the Philippines, on September 22–23.

Medalists

Results

Heats
Wind: Heat 1: +1.5 m/s, Heat 2: +0.7 m/s, Heat 3: +2.4 m/s, Heat 4: +0.4 m/s

Semifinals
Wind: Heat 1: -0.1 m/s, Heat 2: +0.6 m/s

Final
Wind: 0.0 m/s

References

2003 Asian Athletics Championships
200 metres at the Asian Athletics Championships